Mass Sarr Jr. (born February 6, 1973 in Monrovia) is a Liberian retired footballer. A forward, Sarr Jr. is a former player with Selangor FA. He was also a Liberia national football team player from 1989–2002.

Playing career
Sarr spent 18 months at Reading, playing 38 times in all competitions, including 31 league matches.

Sarr played ten times for Sydney Olympic in the Australian National Soccer League during the 2000–01 season.

Post-playing career
Upon moving to Philadelphia, Pennsylvania, he became a leading trainer for several youth athletics clubs in the tri-state area, but he worked primarily in South Jersey with the  Cohansey Soccer Club in Cumberland County, New Jersey. He coached the U17 and U18 youth club team, Cohansey Hornets SC.

References

External links
 
Mass Sarr Junior Moves To Malaysia - www.liberiansoccer.com

Serer sportspeople
1973 births
Living people
Sportspeople from Monrovia
Liberian footballers
Liberian expatriate footballers
Liberia international footballers
1996 African Cup of Nations players
Association football forwards
Mighty Barrolle players
AS Monaco FC players
SAS Épinal players
Olympique Alès players
Expatriate footballers in France
HNK Hajduk Split players
Croatian Football League players
Expatriate footballers in Croatia
Reading F.C. players
English Football League players
Sydney Olympic FC players
Selangor FA players
National Soccer League (Australia) players
Expatriate soccer players in Australia
Expatriate footballers in Malaysia
Expatriate footballers in Monaco
Expatriate footballers in England
2002 African Cup of Nations players
Liberian expatriate sportspeople in England
Liberian expatriate sportspeople in Monaco
Liberian expatriate sportspeople in Malaysia